José Hermes "Chico" Moreira (born 30 September 1958) is a Uruguayan former footballer. Beginning in 1979 he played nine years in the Uruguayan Primera División for Danubio and Nacional. Moreira made 23 appearances for the Uruguay national football team from 1979 to 1981. He was also part of Uruguay's squad for the 1979 Copa América tournament. He later spent 12 years in the United States, playing mostly for indoor soccer clubs.

References

External links
 
 Jose "Chico" Moreira MISL Stats

1958 births
Living people
Uruguayan footballers
Uruguay international footballers
Association football defenders
Danubio F.C. players
Club Nacional de Football players
Major Indoor Soccer League (1978–1992) players
Chicago Sting (MISL) players
Wichita Wings players
Cleveland Crunch (original MISL) players
National Professional Soccer League (1984–2001) players
Canton Invaders (NPSL) players
Continental Indoor Soccer League players
Houston Hotshots players
American Professional Soccer League players
Tampa Bay Rowdies (1975–1993) players
Uruguay under-20 international footballers
Uruguayan expatriate footballers
Uruguayan expatriate sportspeople in the United States
Expatriate soccer players in the United States
People from San José de Mayo